Magic Island is a 1995 American fantasy Adventure comedy direct-to-video film produced by Moonbeam Entertainment and released by Paramount Home Video. It was directed by Sam Irvin and starred Zachery Ty Bryan, Andrew Divoff, Edward Kerr, Lee Armstrong, French Stewart, Jessie-Ann Friend, Oscar Dillon, Abraham Benrubi, Sean O'Kane, Schae Harrison, and Ja'net Dubois.

Plot

Jack Carlisle is a disillusioned 13-year-old boy. His mother is always away at work since his father left. He decides to run away, as he feels his mom won't miss him. As he is ready to leave, his nanny convinces him to read a 'magic book' that belongs to her. The book is about a pirate adventure on Magic Island. As Jack reads the book, he is sucked into the world and goes on numerous adventures with Prince Morgan, while fleeing the evil Blackbeard the Pirate. He is even saved by Lily, a beautiful mermaid, whom he falls in love with. Lily is given the power to turn into a human and accompanies Jack on his adventure. Along the way, Jack encounters sand sharks, a tree that grows the favorite food of the person who climbs it, and a cursed temple full of treasure. Jack also uses items he brought along with him in his "magic" bag to stop the pirates. Blackbeard was transformed into a gold statue by a guardian wizard. Eventually, Jack had to say goodbye to Lily, letting Morgan keep a rug embroidered with gold & jewelry, and Jack is able to return home. He wakes up to his loving mother, and finds that his jeans are still torn and frayed and the flag on Prince Morgan's ship has transformed into his bag—signs that his adventure may have actually happened.

Cast
Zachery Ty Bryan as Jack Carlisle, a 13-year-old boy who is convinced if he runs away, no one will miss him. He gets sucked into the book and joins Prince Morgan, Gwyn, and Dumas on their adventure to find the Treasure before the villainous Captain Blackbeard and his band of pirates.
Andrew Divoff as Blackbeard, the wicked pirate who is determined to get the treasure first at all costs.
Edward Kerr as Prince Morgan, the leader of the good guys.
Lee Armstrong as Gwyn, the only female member of the good group. She is the tough fighter.
French Stewart as Mr. Sapperstein
Jessie-Ann Friend as Lily, who is so named by the fish, for "Lily" means "Mermaid" in "fish-talk." She saves Jack's life when he almost drowns. By saving his life, she is allowed a wish and uses it to gain legs and join Mad Jack on his adventures.
Oscar Dillon as Dumas, the religious member of the good group.
Abraham Benrubi as Duckbone
Sean O'Kane as Jolly Bob
Schae Harrison as Mrs. Carlisle, Jack's mother.
Ja'net Dubois as Lucretia, the Carlisle's housekeeper who gives Jack her "Magic Island" book.
Terry Sweeney as Funny Face (voice)
Martine Beswick as Lady Face (voice)
Isaac Hayes as Mad Face (voice)
Sam Irvin as Carbassas, the guardian of the Treasure.

See also
 List of American films of 1995

External links
 
 

1995 films
1995 direct-to-video films
1990s adventure films
1990s teen comedy films
1990s teen fantasy films
American children's fantasy films
American fantasy adventure films
American fantasy comedy films
Direct-to-video adventure films
Direct-to-video comedy films
Direct-to-video fantasy films
Films set on fictional islands
Films directed by Sam Irvin
Films about magic
Films about mermaids
Films scored by Richard Band
Paramount Pictures direct-to-video films
Pirate films
Films about time travel
1995 comedy films
1990s English-language films
1990s American films